Swiss Cottage Market is an outdoor street market in Camden, North London. Licences to trade are issued by Camden London Borough Council.

History 

Started in 1974 as an informal and unlicensed market in an area of derelict land owned by Camden Council next to the nearby junction of Eton Avenue and Winchester Road.

Forshaw describes a market selling homemade food, secondhand clothes and books as well as bric-à-brac and plants. At the end of 1981 the site was redeveloped and the market moved to a new location close to the sports centre.

Camden Council designated the pedestrianised western end of Eton Avenue as a street market from 1 July 2003 allowing Swiss Cottage Market and Swiss Cottage Farmers Market a permanent home. Swiss Cottage is the youngest of Camden's street markets and, from 2003 stalls, have been licensed and managed by Camden Council.

On Wednesdays it hosts Swiss Cottage Farmers’ Market which is run by London Farmers’ Markets and started in 1999.

In November 2019 Prince Charles and his wife Camilla visited to mark the Farmers Market's twentieth anniversary. Charles had visited the market once before in 2000.

Transport

Bus 

Bus Routes 31 and C11.

Railway and tube 

The nearest station is Swiss Cottage.

References

External links 
 camden.gov.uk/markets—Camden Council's markets webpages
 Swiss Cottage Market—National Market Traders Federation

Tourist attractions in the London Borough of Camden
Retail markets in London
1980 establishments in England
Swiss Cottage